USS Deperm (ADG-10) was a degaussing vessel of the United States Navy, named after the term deperm, a procedure for erasing the permanent magnetism from ships and submarines to camouflage them against magnetic detection vessels and enemy marine mines. Originally planned as a patrol craft escort (PCE-883), she was laid down in 1943, launched in 1944, and commissioned in 1945. She was subsequently redesignated a degaussing vessel, YDG-10, and named Deperm.
 
According to the available depth data in 2020, at this location the bottom is between 1250m and 1500m along the edge of a basin.

References

 

Shipwrecks of the California coast
1944 ships
Degaussing ships of the United States Navy